Mount Sterling is an unincorporated community in Muskingum County, in the U.S. state of Ohio.

History
The Hopewell post office was moved to Mount Sterling without a name change some time after it was established in 1830.

References

Unincorporated communities in Muskingum County, Ohio